Pennwyn is a census-designated place in Cumru Township, Berks County, Pennsylvania, United States.  It is located just to the east of the borough of Mohnton.  As of the 2010 census, the population was 780 residents.

Demographics

References

Census-designated places in Berks County, Pennsylvania
Census-designated places in Pennsylvania